Gareth Low Jun Kit (born 28 February 1997) is a Singaporean who plays as a midfielder for Albirex Niigata Singapore in the S League.

International career

Under-19
Low was called up and captained the Singapore U19 for the friendlies against Bahrain U19 on  31 August and 3 September 2016.

International Statistics

U19 International caps

Honours

Club 
Albirex Niigata (S)

 Singapore Premier League: 2020

References
1.http://www.fas.org.sg/news/bahrain-age-group-teams-play-against-singapore-teams. Squad for matches against Bahrain U19

2.https://int.soccerway.com/players/gareth-low/434676/

1997 births
Living people
Victoria School, Singapore alumni
Singaporean footballers
Young Lions FC players
Singapore Premier League players
Singaporean sportspeople of Chinese descent
Association football midfielders